Asutifi District is a former district that was located in Brong-Ahafo Region (now currently in Ahafo Region), Ghana. Originally created as an ordinary district assembly in 1988. However on 1 February 2012 (effectively 28 June 2012), it was split off into two new districts: Asutifi North District (capital: Kenyasi) and Asutifi South District (capital: Hwidiem). The district assembly was located in the southwest part of Brong-Ahafo Region (now central part of Ahafo Region) and had Kenyasi as its capital town.

List of settlements

Sources
 
 District: Asutifi District

References 

2003 disestablishments in Ghana
Brong-Ahafo Region
Former districts of Ghana